

Egbert Martin Picker (15 February 1895 – 27 March 1960) was a general in the Wehrmacht of Nazi Germany during World War II who commanded several divisions. He was a recipient of the Knight's Cross of the Iron Cross.

Awards and decorations

 Knight's Cross of the Iron Cross on 18 November 1941 as Oberst and commander of Gebirgsjäger-Regiment 98

References

Citations

Bibliography

 

1895 births
1960 deaths
Lieutenant generals of the German Army (Wehrmacht)
German Army personnel of World War I
Recipients of the clasp to the Iron Cross, 1st class
Recipients of the Knight's Cross of the Iron Cross
German prisoners of war in World War II
Military personnel from Nuremberg
People from the Kingdom of Bavaria
German Army generals of World War II